Eclipse of Reason is a 1987 anti-abortion documentary video directed, filmed, and narrated by Bernard Nathanson, with an introduction by  Charlton Heston. Eclipse of Reason is a follow up to Nathanson’s first film The Silent Scream. The film is perhaps most known for its controversial depiction of a dilation and evacuation (D&E) abortion. The subject matter of this film focuses more on the moral implications of abortion. It served as Nathanson’s call to the women of the world to end the practice of abortion. This film, as well as The Silent Scream, was instrumental in the Right to Life Committee's garnering the attention of the United States public regarding the issue of abortion.

Eclipse of Reason represented the argument that the fetus is human, and therefore abortion is murder. The film also serves to combat critics to The Silent Scream who argue that, although Nathanson claimed the film relied only on imagery and not pejorative speech, the film was heavily reliant on upon the language of the narrator. Therefore, Eclipse of Reason delivers the same message that abortion is murder, with similar imagery as its predecessor The Silent Scream; however, to avoid the previous objection of language over imagery Eclipse of Reason asks it viewers to consider reason rather than using emotionally charged narration.

Overview

Eclipse of Reason shows a late term abortion occurring sometime after the fourth month of pregnancy. The film focuses on the limbs of the fetus while in the womb then proceeds to show the abortion in graphic detail. While the fetus in Nathanson’s previous film was little more than a black and white pulsating image, the fetus in Eclipse of Reason was shown vividly in full color.

Different women who have had abortions and suffered harmful effects from the procedure give testimony later in the film.

Nathanson concludes Eclipse of Reason with a montage of photographs that depicts his idea of opposing worlds, one filled with abortions and one without abortions. He argues that we cannot achieve a “World of Reason” without completely eliminating abortions.

Critical reception

According to Newsweek, the film is "harder for critics to dismiss as misleading" than was The Silent Scream.

Eclipse of Reason is most heavily criticized for its idealization of the “World of Reason” and for creating a dichotomy that may not exist in between the two hypothetical worlds. According to one set of critics Nathanson created a world of good (pro-life) versus evil (pro-choice), which directly opposed his intention of creating a film devoid of any sort of emotionally charged language.

References

External links
 On YouTube

Documentary films about abortion
1987 films
1987 documentary films
Anti-abortion movement
American short documentary films
Obscenity controversies in film
American propaganda films
1980s English-language films
1980s American films